The 2018–19 St. Bonaventure Bonnies men's basketball team represented St. Bonaventure University during the 2018–19 NCAA Division I men's basketball season. The Bonnies, led by 12th-year head coach Mark Schmidt, played their home games at the Reilly Center in Olean, New York as members of the Atlantic 10 Conference. They finished the season 18-16, 12-6 in A-10 play for 4th place. They defeated George Mason and Rhode Island to advance to the championship game where they lost to Saint Louis.

Previous season
The Bonnies finished the 2017–18 season 26–8, 14–4 in A-10 play to finish in second place. They defeated Richmond in the quarterfinals of the A-10 tournament before losing in the semifinals to Davidson. They received one of the last four at-large bids to the NCAA tournament where they defeated UCLA in the First Four before losing in the first round to Florida.

Offseason

Departures

Incoming transfers

2018 recruiting class

Roster

Schedule and results

|-
!colspan=12 style=| Exhibition

|-
!colspan=12 style=| Non-conference regular season

|-
!colspan=12 style=| <span style=>Atlantic 10 regular season

|-
!colspan=12 style=| Atlantic 10 tournament

References

St. Bonaventure Bonnies men's basketball seasons
St. Bonaventure